"Lazy" is a single by British house duo X-Press 2, featuring vocals from Scottish-American singer and Talking Heads frontman David Byrne. It was written and produced by X-Press 2 and co-written by Byrne. The song was released on 8 April 2002 through Skint Records and reached number two on the UK Singles Chart, held off number one by "Unchained Melody" by Gareth Gates, and spent four weeks in the UK top 10.

"Lazy" won the Ivors Dance Award at the Ivor Novello Awards in 2003. Byrne later included an orchestral re-recording of the song on his 2004 solo album Grown Backwards, and performed the song during his American Utopia tour.

Background
David Byrne initially approached X-Press 2 to ask them to be his backing band, but they turned the offer down. They confessed, "We had to tell him we're just a bunch of studio gits." As Byrne told Drowned in Sound, "I love the idea of a throbbing beat, and a dancefloor filled with energised bodies, and the singer proclaiming the merits of laziness." Byrne recorded his vocals at his home in New York and then sent them to X-Press 2's recording studio as an email attachment.

Critical reception
Writing in The Guardian, Gary Mullholland called the song "a cheery dance-pop record", whilst Helen Brown praised it as a "glorious dancefloor collaboration".

Music video
The music video is directed by Howard Shur. It features an extremely lazy man (played by American actor Bob Stephenson) who has created a series of contraptions that enable him to go through his daily routine without moving at all. The video begins two shots of a bath with a green hosepipe covering the tap. Then the video shows a transparent pipe in the toilet, with what appears to be urine flowing through it; the camera follows the pipe all the way back to the man, who is urinating into it while sitting on a sofa. He pulls a number of levers that control his furniture and utilities, including his breakfast and hygiene. The man then presses a button which activates a remote-controlled car (or "robot", as it is referred to in the video). As it collects his breakfast, he lies on his side and begins watching TV, but can't find anything on that is worth watching, so he pulls another lever to insert a video labelled "X-Press 2" into the VCR. The video plays a workout video called "XPress-ercise 2", which features four women in thin black outfits. Upon seeing this, the man likes it and sits up. He uses another robotic arm to pick up the phone and hold it to his ear so that he can call someone. As the robot arrives with breakfast, it accidentally spills coffee on itself after driving over a cable and short-circuits, stopping just outside the man's reach. In response, the man hangs up the phone and stretches to reach the food, but falls off the sofa. Looking to his right, he sees a half-eaten Snickers bar covered in dust. Not wanting to stand up and collect his breakfast and continuing to have no luck stretching for them, he grabs the Snickers and starts eating it. The camera zooms outwards as he falls to sleep on the carpet.

Live performances
During a performance on Top of the Pops, Byrne sang while X-Press 2 sat on a bunk bed and at a desk.

Track listings

UK CD single
 "Lazy" (radio edit)
 "Lazy" (original)
 "Lazy" (Norman Cook remix)
 "Lazy" (enhanced video)

UK 12-inch single
A1. "Lazy" (original mix)
AA1. "Lazy" (acapella)
AA2. "Lazy" (reprise)

UK 12-inch single (remixes)
A1. "Lazy" (Norman Cook remix)
A2. "Lazy" (radio edit)
AA1. "Lazy" (Peace Division dub)

European CD single
 "Lazy" (radio edit)
 "Lazy" (Norman Cook remix)

Australian CD single
 "Lazy" (radio edit)
 "Lazy" (original)
 "Lazy" (Norman Cook remix)

US maxi-CD single
 "Lazy" (original) – 9:26
 "Lazy" (Norman Cook remix) – 6:18
 "Lazy" (Norman Cook dub) – 6:42
 "Lazy" (Peace Division dub) – 9:20
 "AC/DC" (Gangbanger mix) – 9:26

Credits and personnel
Credits are adapted from the European CD single liner notes.

Studio
 Recorded at Rocksteady Studio (London, England)
 Mixed at Rollover Studios (London, England)

Personnel
 X-Press 2 – writing, production, arrangement, art direction
 David Byrne – writing, vocals, arrangement
 Pete Z. – keyboards
 James Brown – engineering, mixing
 Adam Wren – mixing
 Tom Hingston Studio – art direction, design
 Jason Evans – photography

Charts

Weekly charts

Year-end charts

Release history

See also
 List of UK top 10 singles in 2002
 List of UK Dance Singles Chart number ones of 2002
 List of UK Independent Singles Chart number ones of 2002

References

2002 songs
2002 singles
David Byrne songs
Columbia Records singles
Songs written by David Byrne
UK Independent Singles Chart number-one singles